Olga Sergeevna Kachura (12 May 1970 – 29 July 2022) was a Ukrainian pro-Russian separatist in the Russo-Ukrainian War, colonel of the Donetsk People's Republic People's Militia and a commander of a rocket artillery divizion. She was known under the call sign Korsa.  

In 2022, Kachura was sentenced by a Ukrainian court to 12 years in prison in absentia, for serving in the DPR army, which Ukraine considers as a terrorist organisation.

Early life and education
Kachura was born on 12 May 1970 in Donetsk. Her family had a history of military service, with her father and grandfather being officers. She graduated from the military department of the Donetsk Polytechnic Institute with a degree in software development for ballistic missile guidance systems.

Career
She worked in the Ministry of Internal Affairs of Ukraine from 1996 to 2012, rising from an investigator to the chief of staff of the Kirov regional department of the Donetsk city police department, and attaining the rank of lieutenant colonel of the Militsiya. Afterwards she worked in the security service of a bank in Donetsk, until 2014 when she joined the DPR People's Militia.

Russo-Ukrainian War
Kachura was a participant in the Russo-Ukrainian War from 2014 onwards. She served in the 3rd separate motorized rifle brigade "Berkut" of the 1st army corps of the Donetsk People's Republic (DPR). She commanded a rocket artillery divizion. In January 2022, Kachura was sentenced by a Ukrainian court to 12 years in prison in absentia, for serving in the DPR army, which Ukraine considers a terrorist organisation.

Personal life
At the time of her death, Kachura was married, had a daughter and a son that she decided to adopt in 2015 after a priest made her his godmother. She was engaged in powerlifting and headed the Horlivka Powerlifting Federation.

Death
Kachura was killed when a Ukrainian missile struck her car on 29 July 2022 in Horlivka. Her death was announced on 3 August 2022. Posthumously, she was awarded the honorary title Hero of the Russian Federation, "for her courage and heroism shown in the performance of military duty."

Notes

References 

1970 births
2022 deaths
Military personnel from Donetsk
Pro-Russian people of the 2014 pro-Russian unrest in Ukraine
People convicted in absentia
Deaths by airstrike during the 2022 Russian invasion of Ukraine
Russian military personnel killed in the 2022 Russian invasion of Ukraine
People of the Donetsk People's Republic
Ukrainian defectors
Ukrainian militsiya officers
Pro-Russian people of the war in Donbas
Ukrainian collaborators with Russia
Heroes of the Russian Federation
Women in the Russian and Soviet military